The Hoffman had two prototype vehicles built by the R.C. Hoffman company of Detroit, Michigan in 1931.  They were front-drive vehicles, powered by Lycoming straight-8 engines.  The wheels were carried on solid load-bearing axles.  Semi-elliptical springs were equipped on the front end, along with torque arms.

References
 

Defunct motor vehicle manufacturers of the United States
Motor vehicle manufacturers based in Michigan
Defunct manufacturing companies based in Detroit